Julia Antonovna Rozanska was a Russian topologist. After studying under Pavel Aleksandrov, she was an associate professor at Moscow State University. She was a member of the Moscow Mathematical Society. She attended the First International Topological Conference, Moscow, 1935.

Works
 
 
 .
 
 
 . The paper she presented at the Moscow Conference, 1935.

References

Year of birth missing
Year of death missing
Topologists
Place of birth missing
Academic staff of Moscow State University
Russian mathematicians
Women mathematicians